The Daly College Ground also known as the Scindia cricket ground, is located at the Daly College in Indore, Madhya Pradesh. The Scindia Pavilion was donated by HH Maharaja Madho Rao Scindia of Gwalior State.

The ground has hosted five First-class cricket matches, when Holkar cricket team played against Madhya Pradesh cricket team beginning in 1955 through 2001.

The ground has hosted ten List A matches from 2002 to 2005.  The first match was played between Uttar Pradesh cricket team and Railways cricket team in 2002. Since then the ground has hosted non-first-class matches.

See also 
 Daly College
 Yeshwant Club
 Yeshwant Club Ground
 Holkar Stadium
 Nehru Stadium

References

External links
Cricinfo profile
Cricketarchive.com
Daly College Ground

Sports venues in Indore
Cricket grounds in Madhya Pradesh
Multi-purpose stadiums in India
Sports venues completed in 1910
1910 establishments in India
20th-century architecture in India